No Limit: A Search for the American Dream on the Poker Tournament Trail is a 2006 documentary film about the professional poker tournament circuit. The film follows producer Susan Genard as she enters several Seven-Card Stud Hi/Lo and Omaha poker tournaments across the country. Dozens of professional poker players appear in the film. No Limit features interviews with over 40 of the top players in the world. No Limit had its premiere screening at The Palms Hotel and Casino on July 27, 2006, and toured the film festival circuit. The film was released on DVD in October 2006. Interview subjects include:

 Amir Vahedi 
 Annie Duke
 Barry Greenstein
 Bobby Baldwin (CEO, Mirage Resorts, Las Vegas)
 Bonnie Damiano
 Charlie Shoten
 Chip Jett
 Chris "Jesus" Ferguson
 Chris Moneymaker
 Clonie Gowen
 Daniel Negreanu
 Dave "Devilfish" Ulliott
 David Sklansky
 Dean Shores
 Doyle Brunson
 Evelyn Ng
 Hendon Mob
 Howard Lederer
 James McManus
 Jennifer Harman
 Kathy Liebert
 Kenna James
 Larry Flynt
 Layne Flack
 Linda Johnson
 Lou Krieger
 Mark Seif
 Mel Judah
 Men "the Master" Nguyen
 "Miami" John Cernuto
 Mike Sexton
 Paul Phillips
 Phil Gordon
 Phil Hellmuth
 Puggy Pearson
 Ron Rose
 Scotty Nguyen
 Steve Lipscomb
 T. J. Cloutier
 Thor Hansen
 Tom McEvoy
 Vince Burgio
 Warren Karp
 Yosh Nakano

External links
 
 Poker movie - The American Dream has no limit - review at Poker News

2006 films
Films about gambling
American sports documentary films
2000s English-language films
2000s American films